Saw Pyei Chantha (also spelled "ရွှေပြည့်ချမ်းသာ", "Shwe Pyei Chantha") was the chief queen consort of Arakan for a few months in 1408. After she and her first husband King Anawrahta of Launggyet were captured by the Hanthawaddy forces in 1408, she became a junior queen consort of King Razadarit of Hanthawaddy.

Brief
The future queen was the second child of Prince Minkhaung of Pyinzi and his first wife Shin Mi-Nauk. His father was a son of then King Swa Saw Ke of Ava while his mother was a daughter of Sawbwa (Chief) Tho Ngan Bwa of Mohnyin. Minkhaung and Mi-Nauk had been wedded in a marriage of state in 1389/90 during a brief respite of hostilities between Ava and Mohnyin.

She had an elder brother Minye Kyawswa, and two younger brothers Minye Thihathu and Minye Kyawhtin. They siblings grew up in Pyinzi, 60 km south of the capital Ava (Inwa), until 1400. On 25 November 1400, their father ascended the Ava throne, and the family moved to Ava.

Circa January 1408, her father sent her to marry Anawrahta, the vassal king of the western kingdom of Arakan, whom her father had appointed a year earlier. But her reign as the chief queen was short. King Razadarit of Hanthawaddy, who had been concerned about Ava's growing empire, ordered an invasion of Arakan while Ava was entangled with the Shan state of Hsenwi in the north. The Hanthawaddy army took Launggyet in March 1408. Razadarit had Anawrahta executed, and raised Saw Pyei Chantha, as one of his junior queens.

The brazen act greatly incensed her father, and led to the renewed war between the two kingdoms for the next decade. The queen joined her paternal aunt Thupaba Dewi, who had been given to Razadarit in a marriage of state as part of the truce of 1403, in the Hanthawaddy king's harem. Three months later, her 34-year-old mother Mi-Nauk became Razadarit's queen as well after Mi-Nauk was captured by the Hanthawaddy forces during Minkhaung's ill-advised invasion of the south in the rainy season of 1408.

Ancestry

Notes

References

Bibliography
 
 
 
 
 
 
 

Chief queens consort of Launggyet
Queens consort of Hanthawaddy
Ava dynasty
Burmese people of Shan descent